The Lowrider Band consists of three of the four surviving original core group members of the multi-platinum selling band War: Howard E. Scott, Lee Oskar, and Harold Brown. These members lost the right in federal court to use and tour under the name "War" in the mid-1990s to Far Out Productions (producer and manager Jerry Goldstein). The band's original keyboardist Lonnie Jordan now tours using the name "War" under Goldstein's guidance.

Current lineup 
Howard E. Scott - guitars, vocals
Lee Oskar - harmonica
Harold Brown - drums, vocals
B.B. Dickerson - bass, vocals (died 2021)
Lance Ellis - saxophone
Chuk Barber - percussion, vocals
Pete Cole - keyboards, vocals
Don Rousell - bass, vocals

References

External links
Official website

War (American band)